Al-Tawahin (also spelled Tawaheen) is a town in northwestern Syria, administratively part of the Tartus Governorate, located east of Baniyas, northeast of al-Qadmus and northwest of Masyaf. It is situated in the Syrian Coastal Mountain Range. According to the Syria Central Bureau of Statistics, al-Tawahin had a population of 2,238 in the 2004 census. It is the administrative center of the Tawahin Subdistrict which contained nine localities with a collective population of 10,024 in 2004. Its inhabitants are predominantly Alawites.

References

Alawite communities in Syria
Populated places in Baniyas District
Towns in Syria